Keith Matthew Simmons (born February 24, 1985) is an American professional basketball player who last played for Banvit of the Turkish Basketball League. He also holds Turkish citizenship.

College
Simmons played for the Holy Cross Crusaders men's basketball team and won the 2007 Patriot League men's basketball tournament. Simmons was awarded Most Valuable Player of the final.

Professional career
In the summer of 2007, he signed a contract with Kepez Belediyespor of the Turkish Basketball League. In the summer of 2008, he signed with Deutsche Bank Skyliners of the Basketball Bundesliga. In the summer of 2009, he signed a contract with Banvit of the Turkish Basketball League.

References

External links 
TBLStat.net Profile

1985 births
Living people
American expatriate basketball people in Germany
American expatriate basketball people in Turkey
American men's basketball players
Bandırma B.İ.K. players
Basketball players from New York (state)
Holy Cross Crusaders men's basketball players
Kepez Belediyesi S.K. players
Naturalized citizens of Turkey
Shooting guards
Skyliners Frankfurt players
Sportspeople from Kingston, New York
Turkish men's basketball players
Turkish people of African-American descent